The Pap of Glencoe is a mountain on the northern side of Glen Coe, in the Highlands of Scotland. It lies at the western end of the Aonach Eagach ridge, directly above the point where the River Coe enters Loch Leven.

The Pap is so named as it has a distinctive conical shape resembling a female breast (see: pap), particularly when viewed from the west. It forms part of the "classic" view of the entrance to Glen Coe.

The simplest route of ascent starts from the unclassified road between Glencoe village and the Clachaig Inn. The final stretch up to the bealach forms a pathway by small gully; this section is often extremely muddy and boggy. The final  of ascent require some easy scrambling, and care is needed under winter conditions.

The Pap may also be climbed from the Kinlochleven side, though this is far less common.

See also
 List of mountains in Scotland
 Maiden Paps
 Breast-shaped hill

References
 Milne, Rob, & Hamish Brown (eds), The Corbetts & Other Scottish Hills, Scottish Mountaineering Club Hillwalkers' Guide (The Scottish Mountaineering Trust, 2002).

External links

Scottish Place Names

Grahams
Marilyns of Scotland
Mountains and hills of the Central Highlands
Mountains and hills of Highland (council area)
Glen Coe